This is a list of European colonial administrators responsible for the territory of the Congo Free State and Belgian Congo (today the Democratic Republic of the Congo).

International Association of the Congo
Prior to the creation of the Congo Free State, the International Association of the Congo (IAC) had signed treaties with over 300 native Congolese chiefs and in effect exercised sovereignty over a large area of the Congo Basin. The IAC was headquartered in Belgium and run by a committee under the presidency of Maximilien Strauch. Prior to the creation of the office of Administrator-General, authority on the ground in the Congo had been exercised by a Chief of Expedition, who until April 1884 was Henry Morton Stanley.

Congo Free State

Administrators-General / Governors-General

Vice Governors-General

Belgian Congo

On 1 July 1960, the Belgian Congo became independent as the Republic of the Congo (République du Congo).

See also
 Colonization of the Congo Basin
 Belgian colonial empire
 Minister of the Colonies (Belgium)
 List of colonial governors of Ruanda-Urundi
 List of presidents of the Democratic Republic of the Congo
 List of prime ministers of the Democratic Republic of the Congo

Notes

References

External links
 World Statesmen – Congo (Kinshasa)

Democratic Republic of the Congo history-related lists